is a Japanese manga series by Rin Kokuyō released as a webtoon on the Comico app. An anime television series adaptation directed by Kazuyoshi Yaginuma and animated by Signal.MD aired from October to December 2017.

In June 2018, Comico ended the manga due to Kokuyō's failing health. Prior to this, Recovery of an MMO Junkie had been on a hiatus since 2015.

Plot
Moriko Morioka is a 30-year-old successful career woman who decides to quit her taxing corporate job and become an elite NEET and find a more fulfilling life. She joins an online MMORPG Fruits de Mer and creates a male character named Hayashi as her avatar. In the game, Hayashi meets another character Lily, a high-level player who helps him learn the game. Hayashi and Lily become close friends and he joins her guild, @HomeParty. Meanwhile, in the real world, Moriko has a chance encounter with a handsome elite company employee, Yuta Sakurai, who may have ties with her online life.

Characters

An unemployed 30-year old single woman and Hayashi's player. She quit her corporate job being disillusioned with the real world and started playing MMORPGs almost nonstop as a way to find meaning in her life.

A 28-year old businessman and Lily's player. He is half-British and is an elite employee at his trading company. Outside of work, he is socially awkward and has a hard time communicating with others.

Yuta's character in Fruits de Mer, a female conductor.

Moriko's character in Fruits de Mer, a male knight.

Yuta's co-worker and Moriko's former co-worker. He and Moriko used to know each other through their working calls, though they never met personally while she was employed. He holds Moriko in high regard as an employee and was upset when she suddenly decided to quit her job leading him to find another job at the trading company Yuta works at.

A college student who works part-time at the convenience store Moriko frequently visits and Kanbe's player. He also plays the MMO game and is aware that Moriko is also a player because she usually purchases electronic money for the game every visit.

Kazuomi's character in Fruits de Mer, a male assassin, and the guild leader.

Himeralda’s spouse in real life.

Pokotaro’s spouse in real life.

Koiwai's character in Fruits de Mer, a muscular female warrior.

Media

Manga
Recovery of an MMO Junkie is written and illustrated by Rin Kokuyō and was serialized on the Comico app from October 2013 to June 2015. Two volumes were published.

Anime
An anime television series adaptation by Signal.MD was announced by Comico. The series began streaming on the Japanese streaming service GyaO on October 6, 2017, and then beginning its TV broadcast October 9, 2017 on Tokyo MX and other stations. Crunchyroll simulcasted the series, while Funimation began streaming a SimulDub on October 30, 2017. The series ran for 10 episodes with an OVA released alongside the Blu-ray box. Crunchyroll streamed the OVA on December 15, 2017.

Notes

References

External links
 

2017 anime television series debuts
Crunchyroll anime
Gender role reversal
Japanese webtoons
Kadokawa Dwango franchises
Media Factory manga
Romantic comedy anime and manga
Signal.MD
Slice of life anime and manga
Tokyo MX original programming
Webtoons in print